A Kind of English is a 1986 British drama film, directed by Ruhul Amin and written by Paul Hallam. It stars Lalita Ahmed, Jamil Ali, Afroza Bulbul, Badsha Haq and Andrew Johnson. The film is about a Bengali family living in London.

Cast
 Lalita Ahmed as Mariom
 Jamil Ali as Samir
 Afroza Bulbul as Shahanara
 Badsha Haq as Chan
 Andrew Johnson as Tariq

Reception
A Kind of English was shown in festivals around the world and earned critical acclaim. The film was compared with early work of De Sica and Satyajit Ray.

See also
 Brick Lane (2007 film)

References

External links
 
 
 
 A Kind of English at Movies.com
 

1986 films
1986 drama films
British Bangladeshi films
British drama films
British independent films
1980s Bengali-language films
Films shot in London
Films set in London
1986 directorial debut films
1980s English-language films
1980s British films